School House Creek is a  long 1st order tributary to Lovills Creek in Surry County, North Carolina.

Course 
School House Creek rises about 1 mile north of Mount Airy, North Carolina in Surry County and then flows south and then southwest to join Lovills Creek about 0.5 miles west of Salem.

Watershed 
School House Creek drains  of area, receives about 47.7 in/year of precipitation, has a wetness index of 329.52, and is about 53% forested.

See also 
 List of North Carolina Rivers

References 

Rivers of Surry County, North Carolina
Rivers of North Carolina